Eileen Browne is an author and illustrator best known for being the author of the Handa books.

Biography 
Browne was born in Birmingham, United Kingdom. She lived in London for more than 20 years before moving to the county of Wiltshire. Browne has worked as a school teacher and a youth worker before becoming a full-time writer and illustrator.

Work 
Browne's books have been praised by Early Childhood Review for including diverse characters and properly presenting different cultures, such as Kenyan life in Handa's Surprise. The Guardian also recognized Handa's Surprise as one of the "50 best culturally diverse children's books." Handa's Surprise is also noted for the use of illustrations to provide the reader with information the main character doesn't have. In 1995, Handa's Surprise was on the shortlist for the Sheffield Children's Book Award. Handa's Surprise has also been adapted into a theatre production using song and puppetry.

Browne continues to fight for diversity in children's books and media, commenting for example, on the lack of female characters in children's television. The narrative that Browne creates is a sense of inclusion, where "colour seems merely incidental."

Browne has related that she was first interested in exploring diversity in the 1980s when she lived in the Finsbury Park area of London. She was running a junior youth club that had a diverse group of children and when the children from her club asked her to put people like them in her books, Browne to realised "how important it was for them to see pictures of themselves."

Books

 Boo Boo Baby and the Giraffe
 Caraway and the Cup Final
 Handa's Hen
 Handa's Surprise
 Handa's Surprising Day
 Handa's Noisy Night
 In a Minute
 Mary Had a Dinosaur
 Nicki
 No Problem
 Through My Window
 Tick Tock
 Up the Tree
 Wait and See
 Wait for Me!
 Where's That Bus?
 Winnie Wagtail

References

External links

Author Profile

Year of birth missing (living people)
Living people
English women novelists
English children's writers
Writers from Birmingham, West Midlands
Place of birth missing (living people)
21st-century English novelists
21st-century English women writers